The 1988 American Soccer League was the first season of the third American Soccer League which took place during the summer of 1988.

History
The third American Soccer League owed its creation to several events in the early 1980s.  In 1983, the second American Soccer League collapsed from over-expansion, runaway spending and a restricted fan base.  A year later, the North American Soccer League collapsed for essentially the same reasons.  In 1985, the West-coast based Western Soccer Alliance was created as a regional, financially austere league.  This new league kept expenditures low while building its fan base.  In 1987, the Lone Star Soccer Alliance began its first season, mimicking the WSA model with teams in or near Texas.  On May 7, 1987, several team executives led by Clive Toye announced the creation of an east coast-based league using the WSA model.  This new league, named the American Soccer League, planned to begin its first season in 1988.  Chuck Blazer was announced as the league's commissioner and Clive Toye was named its chairman.  The league planned a twenty-game schedule with at least six teams having a $75,000 salary cap.  The league initially concentrated on the northeast, but in August 1987, plans expanded to include teams situated in Florida.  This was soon followed by announcements of the entry of the Fort Lauderdale Strikers and Tampa Bay Rowdies.  By October 1987, the list of teams was finalized with the addition of the Orlando Lions and Miami Sharks.  The league now divided itself into two five-team divisions.  On April 9, 1988, the American Soccer League began its first season when the New Jersey Eagles defeated the Miami Sharks, 2–1.  When the regular season ended the first week of August, Eagles had topped the standings with forty-five points.  Four teams made the playoffs, the top two from both the Northern and Southern Divisions.  The Washington Diplomats which had the worst record of the four playoff teams, stunned the league by defeating first the New Jersey Eagles, then the Fort Lauderdale Strikers to win the first league championship.

League standings

Northern Division

Southern Division

Playoffs

Bracket

Semifinal 1

Fort Lauderdale advances two games to none.

Semifinal 2

Washington advances two games to one.

ASL Championship Final

Game 1

Game 2

Points leaders

1988 ASL All-Star game
The ASL All-Star game was hosted by the Fort Lauderdale Strikers at Lockhart Stadium. Players that were unable to play due to injury, as well as any Strikers selected to the squad were replaced, since the All-Stars' opponent was the Strikers. George Best also suited up for the Strikers in the match. The match ended in a 3–3 draw after 90 minutes, and moved directly to a penalty shootout. Both teams converted four of five attempts, and in an unusual move agreed to end it there with the consent of the referees.

All-Star selections

Match summary

See also 
 American Soccer League
 1989 American Soccer League

References

External links
 AMERICAN SOCCER LEAGUE III (RSSSF)
 The Year in American Soccer League - 1988
 Game results

	

1
American Soccer League (1988–89) seasons